Mount Macbeth is a  mountain summit located in the Macbeth Group of the Purcell Mountains in British Columbia, Canada. The first ascent of the mountain was made in 1960 by A. Maki and Robert C. West via the north face. The peak was named for the character in William Shakespeare's Macbeth. The name follows the Macbeth-theme of features surrounding the Macbeth Icefield, such as Mount Lady Macbeth, Mount Macduff, Mount Fleance, and Mount Banquo. The Macbeth name was submitted December 1960 by Robert West, who led a mountaineering party in the area. The mountain's name was officially adopted July 17, 1962, by the Geographical Names Board of Canada.

Climate

Based on the Köppen climate classification, Mount Macbeth is located in a subarctic climate zone with cold, snowy winters, and mild summers. Temperatures can drop below −20 °C with wind chill factors  below −30 °C. Precipitation runoff from Mount Macbeth and meltwater from its surrounding glaciers drains into tributaries of the Duncan River.

See also

List of mountains of Canada
Geography of British Columbia

References

External links
 Weather: Mount Macbeth

Macbeth
Macbeth
Kootenay Land District